Bomarea graminifolia is a species of flowering plant in the family Alstroemeriaceae. It is endemic to Ecuador, where it has only been collected once, before 1908. The specimen probably came from the forests on the volcano Atacazo, near Quito.

References

graminifolia
Endemic flora of Ecuador
Critically endangered plants
Taxonomy articles created by Polbot